Robert Klane (born 1941) is an American screenwriter, novelist and filmmaker, best known for early iconoclastic novels and for his screenplays for dark comedies such as Where's Poppa? (1970) and Weekend at Bernie's (1989).

Career
A 1963 graduate of the University of North Carolina at Chapel Hill, Klane first rose to prominence with his debut novel, the acerbic comedy The Horse is Dead (1968). His second novel, Where's Poppa? (1970), was adapted by Klane into a feature film directed by Carl Reiner and starring George Segal. For his screenplay, Klane received a Writers Guild of America Award nomination. His third novel was also adapted into a feature film, Fire Sale (1977), starring Alan Arkin.

Klane went on to write screenplays for various films such as The Man with One Red Shoe (1985), National Lampoon's European Vacation (1985), and Weekend at Bernie's. He also directed several films including Thank God It's Friday (1978) and Weekend at Bernie's II (1993). Additionally, he wrote for several television shows including M*A*S*H and Tracey Takes On....

Bibliography
The Horse is Dead (1968)
Where's Poppa? (1970)
Fire Sale (1975)

Partial filmography
Where's Poppa? (1970) - wrote screenplay based on his novel
Every Little Crook and Nanny (1972) - co-wrote screenplay
Fire Sale (1977) - wrote screenplay based on his novel
Thank God It's Friday (1978) - directed
Unfaithfully Yours (1984) - co-wrote screenplay
The Man with One Red Shoe (1985) - wrote screenplay
National Lampoon's European Vacation (1985) - co-wrote screenplay
Walk Like a Man - wrote screenplay
Weekend at Bernie's (1989) - wrote screenplay
Folks! (1992) - wrote screenplay
Weekend at Bernie's II (1993) - wrote screenplay and directed

References

External links

1941 births
University of North Carolina at Chapel Hill alumni
Jewish American writers
American male screenwriters
Living people
21st-century American Jews